Anarrhinum is a genus of flowering plants belonging to the family Plantaginaceae.

Its native range is the Mediterranean Basin and West Asia with some reaching as far as Germany and Ethiopia.

Species:
 Anarrhinum bellidifolium (L.) Willd. 
 Anarrhinum corsicum Jord. & Fourr. 
 Anarrhinum duriminium (Brot.) Pers. 
 Anarrhinum forskaohlii (J. F. Gmel.) Cufod. 
 Anarrhinum fruticosum Desf. 
 Anarrhinum laxiflorum Boiss. 
 Anarrhinum longipedicellatum R. Fern. 
 Anarrhinum pedatum Desf.

References

Plantaginaceae
Plantaginaceae genera